She's a Soldier Too is a 1944 American drama film directed by William Castle and written by Melvin Levy. The film stars Beulah Bondi, Nina Foch, Jess Barker, Lloyd Bridges, Percy Kilbride and Ida Moore. The film was released on June 29, 1944, by Columbia Pictures.

Plot

Cast          
 Beulah Bondi as Agatha Kittredge
 Nina Foch as Tessie Legruda
 Jess Barker as Dr. Bill White
 Lloyd Bridges as Charles Jones
 Percy Kilbride as Jonathan Kittredge
 Ida Moore as Julia Kittredge

References

External links
 

1944 films
American drama films
Columbia Pictures films
Films directed by William Castle
American black-and-white films
World War II films made in wartime
1944 drama films
1940s English-language films